Outremont station is a Montreal Metro station in the Outremont borough of Montreal, Quebec, Canada. It is operated by the Société de transport de Montréal (STM) and serves the Blue Line. It opened in 1988.

Overview  
It is a normal side platform station with a mined trainroom and open-cut volume at one end, containing the ticket hall and topped by the one large entrance and a glazed skylight. Classic materials and a mural of glazed ceramics by Gilbert Poissant evoke the architecture of the surrounding neighbourhood, as does a Borough of Outremont lamp post at the foot of the stairs to one platform.

Station upgrade 
In 2021, work began to make the station universally accessible, provide a new ventilation shaft, as well as other refurbishments including flooring, waterproofing and new lighting.

Due to the single entrance building at the staton, upgrade works could not safely take place while the station was open. The station was therefore temporarily closed between January and August 2022, with a shuttle bus provided to take passengers to Acadie station. Works (such as the installation of elevators) will continue until the end of 2023.

Origin of name
The station takes its name from the borough (formerly city) of Outremont, in which it is located. Originally named Côte-Sainte-Catherine, the town took its name in 1875 from a mansion, still extant, built in 1833 by Louis-Tancrède Bouthillier and named "Outre-Mont" ("beyond the mountain" from the main settlement of Montreal).

Connecting bus routes

Nearby points of interest
Collège Stanislas
Théâtre Outremont
Cathédrale arménienne Saint-Grégoire l'Illuminateur

References

External links
Outremont station on STM website
Montreal by Metro, metrodemontreal.com
 2011 STM System Map
 Metro Map

Blue Line (Montreal Metro)
Outremont, Quebec
Railway stations in Canada opened in 1988